Sinomonas notoginsengisoli is a Gram-positive, aerobic and non-motile bacterium from the genus Sinomonas which has been isolated from rhizospheric soil from the plant Panax notoginseng from the Wenshan district of China.

References

Bacteria described in 2015
Micrococcaceae